1978–79 was the fourth season that Division 1 operated as the second tier of ice hockey in Sweden, below the top-flight Elitserien (now the Swedish Hockey League).

Division 1 was divided into four starting groups, based on geography. The top four teams in the group would continue to the playoffs to determine which clubs would participate in the qualifier for promotion to Elitserien. The bottom two teams in each group were relegated to Division 2 for the 1979–80 season.

Regular season

Northern Group

Eastern Group

Southern Group

Western Group

Playoffs

North/East

First round 
 Timrå IK - Hammarby IF 2:0 (6:3, 7:6 OT)
 Kiruna AIF - Västerås IK 2:1 (3:4, 4:3, 4:0)
 Bodens BK - Södertälje SK 1:2 (5:1, 5:6 OT, 2:4)
 Huddinge IK - GroKo Hockey 2:0 (7:3, 12:3)

Second round 
 Timrå IK - Södertälje SK 1:2 (6:4, 4:5 OT, 6:7)
 Huddinge IK - Kiruna AIF 2:0 (9:2, 3:2)

South/West

First round 
 Mora IK - Nybro IF 2:1 (10:0, 5:6, 4:3 OT)
 Bofors IK - Malmö IF 2:0 (8:4, 5:4)
 Karlskrona IK - Fagersta AIK 2:1 (7:2, 2:3, 6:2)
 HV71 - Strömsbro IF 2:0 (10:2, 4:3)

Second round 
 Mora IK - HV71 0:2 (5:7, 3:6)
 Bofors IK - Karlskrona IK 2:0 (9:0, 6:3)

Elitserien promotion

External links
Historical Division 1 statistics on Svenskhockey.com

Swedish Division I seasons
2
Swe